Baskakeren was a king of Kush (about  400 BC). He was likely a son of King Malewiebamani and the younger brother of King Amanineteyerike. He succeeded King Amanineteyerike to the throne.

Baskakeren is so far only known from his small pyramid in Nuri (Nu.17). The size of his pyramid indicates that he reigned for only a short period of time. Known from a stela from his chapel in Meroe Museum (in Khartoum).

References

Further reading 
Laszlo Török, in: Fontes Historiae Nubiorum, Vol. II, Bergen 1996, 435

5th-century BC monarchs of Kush
4th-century BC monarchs of Kush
4th-century BC rulers